Jürgen Henning Illies (14 March 1924 – 2 August 1982) was a German geologist, an expert in taphrogenesis (rift formation). Apart from his work on rifts, including the Rhine Rift Valley, he is known for his contributions to Chilean geology.

Illies was active at the Austral University of Chile in Valdivia where he mapped the geology of the Old Valdivia Province in 1956–1957. After the mapping was done he studied more specific geologic problems in Chile the years of 1958–59. Illies is currently regarded as a "founding father" of the geology department of the Austral University of Chile.

From 1973 onwards he was a member of the German Academy of Sciences Leopoldina.

Notable publications
 1960. Geologie der Gegend von Valdivia/Chile. Neues Jahrbuch fur Geologie u. Palaontlogie, Abhandlungen Bd. 111, S. 30–110. Stuttgart.
 1981. Mechanism of graben formation. Tectonophysics, 73(1), 249-266.

References

Academic staff of the Austral University of Chile
20th-century German geologists
Tectonicists
University of Hamburg alumni
Hans-Stille-Medaille winners
1924 births
1982 deaths
German expatriates in Chile
20th-century Chilean geologists